Late Afternoon is an Irish animated short film directed by Louise Bagnall and produced by Cartoon Saloon.

Summary 
The film is about an elderly woman (voiced by Fionnula Flanagan) coping with dementia as she relives her memories of the past.

Accolades
Nominated for Academy Award for Best Animated Short Film
IFTA Award for Best Animated Short Film
Best Animated Short Film, Baku International Animation Festival

See also 
Alzheimer's disease
2018 in film
Cinema of Ireland

References

External links
Official trailer

Trailer on Vimeo

2017 animated films
2017 films
Irish animated short films
Films about memory
2010s animated short films
Cartoon Saloon films
English-language Irish films
2010s English-language films